Welcome to Night Vale is a 2015 novel written by Joseph Fink and Jeffrey Cranor, based on their popular Welcome to Night Vale podcast.  The book was first released on October 20, 2015, through Harper Perennial in the United States and Orbit Books in the United Kingdom.

Unlike the podcast, the novel is narrated from an omniscient viewpoint that follows Jackie Fierro, the owner of Night Vale's pawn shop, and Diane Crayton, the treasurer of the town's PTA. The audiobook version of the story is narrated by Cecil Baldwin, Dylan Marron, Retta, Thérèse Plummer, and Dan Bittner.

Synopsis
The Man in the Tan Jacket is back in Night Vale and he has been leaving strange pieces of paper with people, all of which say "King City". While Night Vale is used to the strange and bizarre, the Man in the Tan Jacket's arrival puts the town at odds. Jackie Fierro, the owner of the town pawn shop, is determined to figure out the mystery behind both the man and the paper. Meanwhile, Diane Crayton has her own issues: her son has been changing and while this is average for most teenage boys, her son is literally a shape shifter and looks different each time she sees him. When she begins to see her son's father around town and Josh begins to show new interest in the man, Diane knows that this cannot end well.

Reception
Critical reception for Welcome to Night Vale has been positive and the novel was one of the Washington Post's top science-fiction and fantasy picks for October 2015. Cory Doctorow praised the novel in his review at Boing Boing, stating "Shot through it all is the love and integrity that made Night Vale a success from the beginning. After 400 pages, some of Night Vale's mysteries have been laid bare, we've been initiated into new ones, and most of all, we know that we're in the midst of some wonderful people." In contrast, The A.V. Club gave Welcome to Night Vale a grade of C+, criticizing Fink and Cranor for including too many references from the podcast, which they felt "reduces the plot’s progression to a crawl". They also wrote that the book improved in the later chapters, writing that it became "a wonderfully creepy tale filled with revelations about the nature of the town and its residents. Those tantalizing final few chapters provide a glimpse of what Fink and Cranor might be capable of when freed of the constraints of making references and allowed to just tell a story in their fascinating setting."

References

External links
 

2015 American novels
American LGBT novels
2015 science fiction novels
American science fiction novels
2010s horror novels
American horror novels
Works based on podcasts
2015 debut novels
Weird fiction novels
Magic realism novels
LGBT speculative fiction novels
Collaborative novels
HarperCollins books
Orbit Books books
Night Vale Presents